James Lewis Hoberman (born March 14, 1949) is an American film critic, journalist, author and academic. He began working at The Village Voice in the 1970s, became a full-time staff writer in 1983, and was the newspaper's senior film critic from 1988 to 2012.

Early and personal life
Hoberman was born to a Jewish family in Brooklyn. His ancestors immigrated to the United States from Poland, Ukraine, Austria-Hungary, and Alsace-Lorraine. He grew up primarily in Fresh Meadows, Queens. Hoberman completed his B.A. degree at Binghamton University and his M.F.A. at Columbia University. At Binghamton, prominent experimental filmmaker Ken Jacobs both instructed and influenced him.

Hoberman and his wife, a social worker, married in 1974. They have two daughters. He is an atheist.

Career
After completing his MFA Hoberman worked for The Village Voice as under Andrew Sarris. Hoberman specialized in writing about experimental film for the weekly paper: his first published review (in 1977) was of David Lynch's seminal debut film Eraserhead. In the mid-1970s, Hoberman contributed text articles to the underground comix anthology Arcade, edited by Art Spiegelman and Bill Griffith. From 2009 to 2012, Hoberman was the senior film editor at the Village Voice, where he was also an active leader in the staff union.

Since 1990, Hoberman has taught cinema history at Cooper Union. He has also lectured on film at Harvard and New York University. In addition to his academic and professional career, Hoberman is the author of several important books on cinema, including a collaboration with fellow film critic Jonathan Rosenbaum, entitled Midnight Movies, published in 1983.

At the 2008 San Francisco International Film Festival, Hoberman was honored with the prestigious Mel Novikoff Award, an annual award "bestowed on an individual or institution whose work has enhanced the filmgoing public's knowledge and appreciation of world cinema." Hoberman appears in the 2009 documentary film For the Love of Movies: The Story of American Film Criticism, recalling his first movie memory, going with his mother to see Cecil B. DeMille's The Greatest Show On Earth (1952), and how he was mesmerized by a scene in that film that depicts a train crash.

In January 2012, the Village Voice laid off Hoberman in a move to cut costs. Hoberman said, "I have no regrets and whatever sadness I feel is outweighed by a sense of gratitude. Thirty-three years is a long time to be able to do something that you love to do, to champion things you want to champion, and to even get paid for it."

Following his tenure at the Village Voice, Hoberman has contributed articles to other publications, including The Guardian and The New York Review of Books. He also contributes regularly to Film Comment, The New York Times, and The Virginia Quarterly Review.

Hoberman participated in the 2012 Sight & Sound critics' poll, where he listed his ten favorite films as follows: Au Hasard Balthazar, Flaming Creatures, The Girl from Chicago, Man with a Movie Camera, Pather Panchali, The Rules of the Game, Rose Hobart, Shoah, Two or Three Things I Know About Her..., and Vertigo.

Bibliography

Books

Essays and reporting

References

External links
 J. Hoberman website
 J. Hoberman's Top Ten Lists, 1977-2005
 Video: Interview with J. Hoberman

1949 births
Living people
20th-century American journalists
20th-century American male writers
20th-century American non-fiction writers
21st-century American journalists
21st-century American male writers
21st-century American non-fiction writers
American film critics
American male journalists
American male non-fiction writers
American people of German-Jewish descent
American people of Hungarian-Jewish descent
American people of Polish-Jewish descent
American people of Ukrainian-Jewish descent
Binghamton University alumni
Columbia University School of the Arts alumni
Critics employed by The New York Times
Harvard University staff
Jewish American atheists
Jewish American journalists
Journalists from New York City
National Society of Film Critics Members
New York University faculty
The Guardian journalists
The New York Review of Books people
The Village Voice people
Writers from Queens, New York